The 2019 Canadian American Association of Professional Baseball season began May 16 and ended September 2. It was the 15th season of operations for the league. Following the regular season, the playoffs were held. The New Jersey Jackals defeated the previous defending champions Sussex County Miners in the fourth game of the championship round on September 14, 2019. It was the Jackals’ fifth championship overall as a team for the first time in fifteen years, but it was their first championship title as a member of the Can-Am League.

This would be the last season in Can-Am League history, as the league announced on October 16, 2019 that they would merge with the Frontier League and operate as a 14-team league under the Frontier League banner. All teams except the Ottawa Champions were absorbed by the Frontier League.

Season summary
Once again, the Cuban National Baseball Team and Shikoku Island team both toured during the regular season, facing all six of the Can-Am League teams. This season also saw the Empire League playing four games. Shortly after this season, the Can-Am League merged with the Frontier League, absorbing five of its teams to make a total of 14 teams.

All-star game and home run derby

In the 2019 season, the league held a home run derby and all-star game. The events took place on July 9–10, 2019 at Palisades Credit Union Park, home of the Rockland Boulders. In both events, the Can-Am League All-Stars faced the Frontier League All-Stars. The home run derby was played on July 9, 2019, where Boulders star Grant Heyman won the home run derby for the Can-Am League. The all-star game was played the following day, July 10, where the Frontier League defeated the Can-Am League, 7–0. J.J. Hernandez was named the all-star game MVP for the Frontier League.

Standings 

* Teams not eligible for playoffs

Playoffs

Bracket

Semifinals

Sussex County vs. Rockland

Trois-Rivieres vs. New Jersey

Championship

New Jersey vs. Sussex County

Attendance

References

External links
Can-Am League website

Canadian American Association of Professional Baseball
Canam
Canam
Canam